Nitin Samarth is an American physicist, currently the George A. and Margaret M. Downsbrough Department Head and Professor of Physics in the Eberly College of Science, Pennsylvania State University. 

He obtained his undergraduate degree in physics from the Indian Institute of Technology Bombay in 1980 and his Ph.D. in physics from Purdue University in 1986. Samarth's research interests center on spintronic phenomena in thin films and nanostructures derived from semiconductors, magnetic materials and superconductors. He has pioneered the synthesis of a variety of materials in this context, resulting in key advances in semiconductor spintronics and, more recently, topological spintronics. Samarth's research is published in over 200 articles and has over 23,000 citations (GoogleScholar). 

He is a Fellow of the American Physical Society (2003) and Fellow of the American Association for the Advancement of Science (2013. He received an Outstanding Physics Alumnus Award from Purdue University (2008). At Penn State, he was awarded the Faculty Scholar Medal in the Physical Sciences (2008)  and the George W. Atherton Award for Teaching Excellence (2007).

References

Year of birth missing (living people)
Living people
21st-century American physicists
Pennsylvania State University faculty
IIT Bombay alumni
Fellows of the American Association for the Advancement of Science
Fellows of the American Physical Society
American academics of Indian descent
Indian scholars